Fight the New Drug (FTND) is a nonprofit and non-legislative anti-pornography organization that is based in Utah. The group was founded in Utah in 2009. FTND describes pornography as analogous to a drug and argues that it is a public health issue.

Activities
The group works with people aged 18 to 24 through presentations and video campaigns, and through student outreach activities in public school districts within Utah. In a 2015 campaign, FTND posted 100 billboards in the San Francisco Bay Area stating "Porn Kills Love". In March 2018 the Kansas City Royals held a FTND anti-pornography seminar for players during their spring training, and in November of that year FTND released a three-part documentary film entitled Brain, Heart, World. In addition, the group promotes its campaign via a social media presence, branded merchandise, such as T-shirts, and marketing kits.

Support

A number of public figures have endorsed the group: these include Utah Attorney General Mark Shurtleff; sports personalities Terry Crews and Lamar Odom;  actress Marisol Nichols; and YouTuber Chaz Smith.

Criticism
FTND has been criticized as holding an "openly ideologically-driven strategy" and the group's message, in particular its categorizing of porn as a drug, as pseudoscience, contradictory to neuroscience research. The group have been alleged to be an example of continued influence by LDS Church members over social issues, for example in their use of billboards in San Francisco intentionally to target a socially progressive region. In a Salt Lake Tribune op-ed, a group of sex therapists said that FTND's leaders and presenters were not mental health or sexuality professionals, and were promoting false information and failing to educate children about either sexuality and human development, or the positive, as well as the negative, aspects of porn.

References

2009 establishments in Utah
501(c)(3) organizations
Anti-pornography movements
Organizations established in 2009
Pseudoscience
Non-profit organizations based in Utah